The saboted light armor penetrator (SLAP) family of firearm ammunition is designed to penetrate armor more efficiently than standard armor-piercing ammunition. In the US it was developed by the Marine Corps during the mid/late 1980s and was approved for service use in 1990 during Operation Desert Storm. It uses a reduced caliber, heavy metal (tungsten) .30 inch diameter penetrator wrapped in a plastic sabot of .50 inch diameter, and the .308 SLAP round was a .223 inch diameter penetrator core within the .308 inch plastic sabot.

Design and use 

The SLAP design incorporates a polymer sabot, which allows for the use of a tungsten penetrator projectile of a lesser diameter than the original bore.  By using the casing of a large cartridge with a lightweight projectile, the velocity of the projectile is greatly increased and the sectional density is improved without requiring a (potentially dangerous) increase in chamber pressure.

SLAP rounds have been designed for use against lightly armored vehicles and aircraft.

Saboted ammunition should not be used in firearms with muzzle brakes unless the muzzle brake has been specifically designed for such use. 50 SLAP ammunition is completely interoperable with M2 machine guns with stellite liner.

Types of SLAP ammunition

Production
US SLAP ammunition is produced by the Winchester Cartridge Company and Olin Manufacturing. The team began production of the ammunition in 1985. The sabot that contains the sub-caliber is manufactured by Cytec Industries.

See also
 Armour-piercing discarding sabot – the equivalent class of ordnance caliber ammunition.

References

Ammunition